Paladin Industries, Inc was an American aircraft manufacturer, based in Pennsauken, New Jersey. The company specialized in the design and construction of powered parachutes.

The company's website was removed in 2012 and the company seems to have gone out of business.

Aircraft

References

External links

Defunct aircraft manufacturers of the United States
Powered parachutes
Companies based in Camden County, New Jersey